Inti Podestá Mezzetta (born 23 April 1978) is an Uruguayan retired footballer who played as a midfielder.

Club career
In a relatively short career, Montevideo-born Podestá played for Danubio F.C. and Spain's Sevilla FC. With the latter, to where he moved in 1999, his presence was merely testimonial, his best output being 14 games with three goals in the 2000–01 season as the Andalusia club returned to La Liga after one year of absence.

In the following campaign, Podestá featured more (15 matches) but did not find the net. After only eight league appearances in the next three years combined, he retired in July 2004 at only 26.

International career
Podestá made one appearance for Uruguay, in a friendly prior to the 1999 Copa América on 17 June, a 3–2 win in Paraguay. Summoned for the final stages, he did not leave the bench for the eventual runners-up.

Honours

Club
Sevilla
Segunda División: 2000–01

Country
Copa América: Runner-up 1999

References

External links

National team data 

1978 births
Living people
Footballers from Montevideo
Uruguayan footballers
Association football midfielders
Uruguayan Primera División players
Danubio F.C. players
La Liga players
Segunda División players
Sevilla FC players
Uruguay under-20 international footballers
Uruguay international footballers
1999 Copa América players
Uruguayan expatriate footballers
Expatriate footballers in Spain
Uruguayan expatriate sportspeople in Spain
Uruguayan people of Italian descent